Isai Nunukkam is a grammar book for the Tamil language. It was written by Sikandi, before the second Sangam period.

References

Tamil language
Tamil-language literature
Ancient Tamil Nadu